Monte John Merkel (November 6, 1916 – July 22, 1981) was an American football guard who played one season with the Chicago Bears of the National Football League. He played college football at the University of Kansas and attended St. John's Military Academy in Delafield, Wisconsin.

References

External links
Just Sports Stats

1916 births
1981 deaths
Players of American football from Iowa
American football guards
Kansas Jayhawks football players
Chicago Bears players
People from Benton County, Iowa